Emotivna luda (English: Emotionally Crazy) is the eighth studio album by Serbian singer Ceca. It was released in 1996.

Track listing
Kad bi bio ranjen
Rođen sa greškom
Zabranjeno pušenje
Mrtvo more
Neodoljiv neumoljiv
Ličiš na moga oca
Doktor
Usnule lepotice
Isuse

References

1996 albums
Ceca (singer) albums